Celatoxia marginata, the margined hedge blue, is a species of butterfly belonging to the lycaenid family described by Lionel de Nicéville in 1894. It is found in  the Indomalayan realm.

Subspecies
Celatoxia marginata marginata (Himalayas to Burma, northern Thailand, Laos, northern Vietnam, Yunnan, Taiwan)
Celatoxia marginata splendens (Butler, 1900) (Malay Peninsula)

References

External links
"Celatoxia Eliot & Kawazoé, 1983" at Markku Savela's Lepidoptera and Some Other Life Forms

Celatoxia
Butterflies described in 1894